Tiago Ulisses Aparecido Eugenio Sobral (born 9 May 1989) is a Brazilian professional footballer who plays as a midfielder.

Career
Born in São Paulo, Brazil, Ulisses spent seven years as an academy player with Corinthians from 2001 to 2008.

In 2011, Ulisses scored one goal in 11 appearances for Noroeste in the second-tier Campeonato Paulista Série A2 before moving to Botafogo, where he made 15 appearances in 2012.

Ulisses signed with Vancouver Whitecaps FC of Major League Soccer on 3 August 2012, and was released by the club without making a first team appearance three months later. After a one-year spell back to his home country with Guaratinguetá, Ulisses joined UD Almería B in Segunda División B.

References

External links
 

1989 births
Living people
Brazilian footballers
Esporte Clube Noroeste players
Botafogo Futebol Clube (SP) players
Vancouver Whitecaps FC players
Guaratinguetá Futebol players
Brazilian expatriate footballers
Brazilian expatriate sportspeople in Spain
Expatriate soccer players in Canada
Expatriate footballers in Spain
UD Almería B players
Association football midfielders
Footballers from São Paulo